Arba Minch Airport  is an airport serving Arba Minch, a city in the Southern Nations, Nationalities, and Peoples' Region (SNNPR) in Ethiopia. The name of the city and airport may also be transliterated as Arba Mintch.

Facilities 

Airlines and destinations

Military use 
In October 2011 it was confirmed that the U.S. Seventeenth Air Force was operating General Atomics MQ-9A Reaper unmanned aerial vehicles from the airport for reconnaissance over Somalia. Master Sergeant James Fisher, spokesman for the 17th Air Force, said that an unspecified number of Air Force personnel are working at the Ethiopian airfield “to provide operation and technical support for our security assistance programs.” He also said that the drone flights “will continue as long as the government of Ethiopia welcomes our cooperation on these varied security programs.” The United States military has spent millions of dollars upgrading the airbase to handle the Reapers, and is being used to surveil al-Shabab, but will not conduct airstrikes from the base. However, according to OSGEOINT, mapped imagery of the MQ-9A ranges may also suggest mission support to other countries outside of Somalia.

Air Force (magazine notes in its 2012/13 annual survey of units that the 409th Air Expeditionary Group operates ISR aircraft from unspecified locations in the United States Air Forces Africa area of responsibility.
In early April 2012, the second drone crash in four months was reported at the Reaper detachment in Mahe, Seychelles.

The enclave at the base closed down during January 2016.

References

External links 
 

Airports in Ethiopia
Southern Nations, Nationalities, and Peoples' Region